This article details the Hull Kingston Rovers rugby league football club's 2016 season. This was the 21st season of the Super League era.

Fixtures and results

Super League fixtures

Super 8's

Play-offs

Player appearances
Super League Only

 = Injured

 = Suspended

Challenge Cup

Player appearances
Challenge Cup Games only

Squad statistics

 Appearances and points include (Super League, Challenge Cup and Play-offs) as of 28 March 2016.

 = Injured
 = Suspended

Transfers in/out

In

Out

References

External links
Leeds Rhinos Website
Leeds Rhinos - SL Website

Hull Kingston Rovers seasons
Super League XXI by club